The 1999 FIBA European Championship, commonly called FIBA EuroBasket 1999, was the 31st FIBA EuroBasket regional basketball championship held by FIBA Europe, which also served as Europe qualifier for the 2000 Olympic Tournament, giving a berth to the top five (or six, depending on Yugoslavia reaching one of the top five places) teams in the final standings. It was held in France between 21 June and 3 July 1999. Sixteen national teams entered the event under the auspices of FIBA Europe, the sport's regional governing body. The cities of Antibes, Clermont-Ferrand, Dijon, Le Mans, Paris, Pau and Toulouse hosted the tournament. Italy won its second FIBA European title by defeating Spain with a 64–56 score in the final. Italy's Gregor Fučka was voted the tournament's MVP.

Venues

Qualification

Of the sixteen teams that participated in EuroBasket 1999 only two earned direct berths: France as hosts and the champions from EuroBasket 1997, Yugoslavia. The other fourteen teams earned their berths via a qualifying tournament.

Format
The teams were split in four groups of four teams each where they played a round robin. The top three teams from each group advance to the second stage.
In the second stage, two groups of six teams were formed and played a round robin. The results between teams that faced during the preliminary round are carried over. The top four teams from each group in the second stage advance to the knockout quarterfinals to compete for the Championship. The winners in the semifinals compete for the European Championship, while the losers from the semifinals play a consolation game for the third place.
The losers in the quarterfinals compete in a separate bracket to define 5th through 8th place in the final standings.

Tie-breaking criteria
Ties were broken via the following the criteria, with the first option used first, all the way down to the last option:
 Head to head results
 Basket difference between the tied teams
 Goal average of the tied teams for all teams in its group

Squads

At the start of tournament, all 16 participating countries had 12 players on their roster.

Preliminary round

Times given below are in Central European Summer Time (UTC+2).

Group A

|}

Group B

|}

Group C

|}

Group D

|}

Second round

Group E

|}

Group F

|}

Knockout stage

Championship bracket

Quarterfinals

Semifinals

Third place

Final

5th to 8th place

Statistical leaders

Individual Tournament Highs

Points

Rebounds

Assists

Steals

Minutes

Individual Game Highs

Team Tournament Highs

Offensive PPG

Rebounds

Assists

Steals

Team Game highs

Awards

Final standings

References

External links
 1999 European Championship for Men archive.FIBA.com

 
1999
1998–99 in French basketball
1998–99 in European basketball
International basketball competitions hosted by France